Sam Dana (August 7, 1903 – October 29, 2007), born Samuel Salemi, was a professional American football player who played running back for two seasons for the Hartford Blues and New York Yankees. At the time of his death, Dana was thought to be the oldest living NFL player.

Personal life
Dana was known as Sam "Smoke" Salemi during his playing days. He legally changed his last name to Dana in 1945.

References

1903 births
2007 deaths
American centenarians
American football running backs
Columbia Lions football players
Hartford Blues players
Men centenarians
New York Yankees (NFL) players